Oxyria digyna (mountain sorrel, wood sorrel, Alpine sorrel or Alpine mountain-sorrel) is a species of flowering plant in the buckwheat family (Polygonaceae). It is native to arctic regions and mountainous parts of the Northern Hemisphere.

Description
It grows in dense tufts, with stems that are usually unbranched and hairless. Both flowering stems and leaf stalks are somewhat reddish. The leaves are kidney-shaped, somewhat fleshy, on stalks from the basal part of the stem. Flowers are small, green and later reddish, and are grouped in an open upright cluster. The fruit is a small nut, encircled by a broad wing which finally turns red. Forming dense, red tufts, the plant is easily recognized. Oxyria digyna grows in wet places protected by snow in winter. Oxyria (from Greek) means "sour".

Distribution and habitat
Mountain sorrel is common in the tundra of the Arctic. Further south, it has a circumboreal distribution, growing in high mountainous areas in the Northern Hemisphere such as the Alps, the Sierra Nevada, and the Cascade Range. It typically grows in alpine meadows, scree, snow-bed sites and beside streams.

On the coast of Norway, the pollen of this plant has been found in peat bogs that are 12,600 years old, indicating that it must have been one of the first plants to colonise the area after the retreating ice age glaciers.

Deer and elk favor the plant.

Uses
The leaves of mountain sorrel have a sour or fresh acidic taste (due to oxalic acid) and are rich in vitamin C, containing about 36 mg/100 g. They can be eaten raw or cooked. They were used by the Inuit to prevent and cure scurvy. The plant is important for both insects and larger animals that feed on it in arctic and alpine regions where it occurs.

References

External links

Jepson Manual Treatment
Photo gallery

Polygonoideae
Alpine flora
Edible plants
Flora of Europe
Flora of North America
Flora of temperate Asia